The following outline is provided as an overview of and topical guide to Ontario:

Ontario – one of the provinces of Canada, located in east-central Canada. It is Canada's most populous province or territory and fourth largest in total area. It is home to the nation's capital city, Ottawa, and the nation's most populous city, Toronto.

General reference 
 Pronunciation: 
 Common English name(s): Ontario
 Official English name(s): Ontario
 Nicknames:
 The Heartland Province
 The Province of Opportunity (dated, official provincial slogan, formerly seen on provincial highway construction project signs)
 Common endonym(s): Ontario
 Official endonym(s): Ontario
 Adjectival(s): Ontario
 Demonym(s): Ontarian

Geography of Ontario 

Geography of Ontario
 Ontario is: a province of Canada.
 Canada is: a country
 Population of Ontario: 12,851,821 (2011 census)
 Area of Ontario: 917,741 km2 (354,342 sq mi)
 85.3% land
 14.7% water
 List of Ontario area codes
 Atlas of Ontario

Location 
 Ontario is situated within the following regions:
 Northern Hemisphere, Western Hemisphere
 Americas
 North America
 Northern America
 Laurentia
 Canada
 Central Canada
 Eastern Canada
 Canadian Shield
 Time zones (see also Time in Canada):
 Eastern Standard Time (UTC-05), Eastern Daylight Time (UTC-04)  – includes most of the province
 Extreme points of Ontario
 Highest point of Ontario
 Landforms of Ontario

Environment of Ontario 

Environment of Ontario
 Climate of Ontario
 Ecology of Ontario
 Ecoregions in Ontario
 Renewable energy in Ontario
 Geology of Ontario
 Protected areas of Ontario
 Biosphere reserves in Ontario
 National parks in Ontario
 List of designated places in Ontario
 List of historic places in Ontario
 List of National Historic Sites of Canada in Ontario
 List of Ontario provincial parks
 Wildlife of Ontario
 Flora of Ontario
 Fauna of Ontario
 Birds of Ontario
 Mammals of Ontario

Natural geographic features of Ontario 

Landforms of Ontario
 Fjords of Ontario
 Glaciers of Ontario
 Islands of Ontario
 Lakes of Ontario
 List of dams and reservoirs in Ontario
 Rivers of Ontario
 Waterfalls of Ontario
 Mountains of Ontario
 Volcanoes in Ontario
 Valleys of Ontario

Heritage sites in Ontario 
 World Heritage Sites in Ontario (1)
 Rideau Canal
National Historic Sites of Canada in Ontario

Regions of Ontario 
 Southern Ontario
 Central Ontario
 Eastern Ontario
 Golden Horseshoe
 Southwestern Ontario
 Northern Ontario
 Northeastern Ontario
 Northwestern Ontario
 Great Lakes

Administrative divisions of Ontario 

Administrative divisions of Ontario
 List of census agglomerations in Ontario
 List of census divisions of Ontario
 List of census subdivisions in Ontario
 List of communities in Ontario
 List of ghost towns in Ontario
 List of Ontario census divisions by population
 List of townships in Ontario
 List of municipalities in Ontario
 List of Ontario federal electoral districts
 List of Ontario separated municipalities
 List of Ontario provincial electoral districts
 List of population centres in Ontario

Counties and districts of Ontario 
The counties of Ontario, each followed by its county seat:

 Bruce County (Walkerton)
 Dufferin County (Orangeville)
 Elgin County (St. Thomas)
 Essex County (Essex)
 Frontenac County (Kingston)
 Grey County (Owen Sound)
 Haliburton County (Minden)
 Hastings County (Belleville)
 Huron County (Goderich)
 Lambton County (Wyoming)
 Lanark County (Perth)
 Leeds and Grenville United Counties (Brockville)
 Lennox and Addington County (Napanee)
 Middlesex County (London)
 Northumberland County (Cobourg)
 Perth County (Stratford)
 Peterborough County (Peterborough)
 Prescott and Russell United Counties (L'Orignal)
 Renfrew County (Pembroke)
 Simcoe County (Springwater Township)
 Stormont, Dundas and Glengarry United Counties (Cornwall)
 Wellington County (Guelph)

The districts of Ontario, each followed by its district seat:

 Algoma District (Sault Ste. Marie)
 Cochrane District (Cochrane)
 Kenora District (Kenora)
 Manitoulin District (Gore Bay)
 Nipissing District (North Bay)
 Parry Sound District (Parry Sound)
 Rainy River District (Fort Frances)
 Sudbury District (Espanola)
 Thunder Bay District (Thunder Bay)
 Timiskaming District (Haileybury)

First Nations of Ontario 
 Anishinabek Nation
 First Nations in Ontario
 List of Indian reserves in Ontario

Municipalities of Ontario 

List of municipalities in Ontario
 Population centres in Ontario
 Municipalities by type
 Cities of Ontario
 Capital of Canada; Ottawa
 Capital of Ontario: Toronto
 Mississauga
 Brampton
 Hamilton
 London
 Markham
 Vaughan
 Kitchener
 Windsor
 communities in Ontario
Towns in Ontario
 Township municipalities in Ontario
Villages in Ontario
Former municipalities in Ontario

Demography of Ontario 

Demographics of Ontario
 List of population centres in Ontario
 List of Ontario census divisions by population
 Population compared to other provinces

Government and politics of Ontario 

Politics of Ontario
 Form of government:
 Capital of Ontario: Toronto
 Elections in Ontario
 List of Ontario general elections
 Political parties in Ontario
 Political scandals of Ontario
 Taxation in Ontario

Branches of the government of Ontario 

Government of Ontario

Executive branch of the government of Ontario 
 Head of state: King in Right of Ontario, King of Canada, King Charles III
 Head of state's representative (Viceroy): Lieutenant Governor of Ontario, David Onley
 Previous lieutenant governors
 Head of government: Premier of Ontario, Kathleen Wynne
 Previous premiers
 Premiers of Ontario by time in office
 Deputy Premier of Ontario
 Previous Deputy Premiers
 Cabinet: Executive Council of Ontario
 Head of council: Lieutenant Governor in Council, as representative of the King in Right of Ontario
 Leader of the government in parliament
 Departments of the Ontario Government
 Ministry of Aboriginal Affairs
 Ministry of Agriculture, Food and Rural Affairs
 Ministry of Children and Youth Services
 Ministry of Citizenship and Immigration
 Ministry of Community and Social Services
 Ministry of Consumer Services
 Ministry of Culture
 Ministry of Economic Development and Innovation
 Ministry of Education
 Ministry of Energy
 Ministry of Finance
 Ministry of Government Services
 Ministry of Health Promotion and Sport
 Ministry of Intergovernmental Affairs
 Ministry of International Trade and Investment
 Ministry of Labour
 Ministry of Municipal Affairs and Housing
 Ministry of Natural Resources
 Ministry of Research and Innovation
 Ministry of Revenue
 Ministry of Skills Development
 Ministry of the Environment
 Ministry of Tourism and Culture
 Ministry of Training, Colleges and Universities

Legislative branch of the government of Ontario 

 Parliament of Ontario (unicameral): Legislative Assembly of Ontario
 Speaker of the Legislative Assembly of Ontario
 Ontario Legislative Building
 Ontario Legislative Assemblies
 Federal representation
 Ontario lieutenant
 List of Ontario senators

Judicial branch of the government of Ontario 

Federal Courts of Canada
 Supreme Court of Canada
 Federal Court of Appeal
 Tax Court of Canada
 Canadian court of appeal: Ontario Court of Appeal
 Superior court: Ontario Superior Court
 Provincial Court: Court of Ontario
 The Civil Division
 The Criminal and Penal Division
 The Youth Division
 Military court: Court Martial Appeal Court of Canada

International relations of Ontario 

 Ministry of International Relations
 Ontario Government Offices

Law and order in Ontario 

Law of Ontario
 Bar of Ontario –  the provincial  law society  for lawyer s in Ontario (officially known by its French designation: Barreau du Québec)
 Capital punishment in Ontario: none.
 Ontario, as with all of Canada, does not have capital punishment.
 Canada eliminated the death penalty for murder on July 14, 1976.
 Constitution of Ontario
 Criminal justice system of Ontario
 Crime in Ontario
 Organized crime in Ontario
 Human rights in Ontario
 LGBT rights in Ontario
 Same-sex marriage in Ontario
 Law enforcement in Ontario
 Penal system of Ontario
 Correctional facilities in Ontario

Military of Ontario 

Canadian Forces
Being a part of Canada, Ontario does not have its own military.

Local government in Ontario 

Local government in Ontario

History of Ontario

History of Ontario, by period

History of Ontario, by region

History of Ontario, by subject

Culture of Ontario 

Culture of Ontario
 Architecture of Ontario
 Tallest buildings in Ontario
 Cuisine of Ontario
 Ontario wine
 Festivals in Ontario
 Humor in Ontario
 Media in Ontario
 Museums in Ontario
 Order of precedence in Ontario
 People of Ontario
 List of members of the Order of Ontario
 List of people from Ontario
 Prostitution in Ontario
 Public holidays in Ontario
 Public libraries in Ontario
 Records of Ontario
 Regional culture in Ontario (culture by region)
 Culture of Montreal
 Scouting and Guiding in Ontario

Art in Ontario 
 Art in Ontario
 Cinema of Ontario
 Comedy of Ontario
 Dance of Ontario
 Literature of Ontario
 Music of Ontario
 List of musicians from Ontario
 Television in Ontario
 Theatre in Ontario

Religion in Ontario 

Religion in Ontario
 Buddhism in Ontario
 Christianity in Ontario
 Anglicanism in Ontario
 Anglican Diocese of Ontario
 Roman Catholicism in Ontario
 Roman Catholic Archdiocese of Ontario
 Hinduism in Ontario
 Islam in Ontario
 Judaism in Ontario
 Sikhism in Ontario
 Irreligion in Ontario

Sports in Ontario 

 Curling in Ontario
 Curling clubs in Ontario
 Baseball in Ontario
 Football in Ontario
 Ice Hockey in Ontario
 Ontario Hockey League
 Ice hockey teams in Ontario
 Ontario Hockey Association Junior A seasons
 Rugby Ontario
 Professional sports teams in Ontario

Symbols of Ontario 

Symbols of Ontario
 Coat of arms of Ontario
 Flag of Ontario
 Provincial flower:
 Provincial bird:
 Provincial tree:
 Provincial motto:
 Provincial symbol:
 Provincial capital:

Economy and infrastructure of Ontario 

Economy of Ontario
 Economic rank (by nominal GDP) - This ranking shows only the Rank of Canada, the country in which is located Ontario
 Agriculture in Ontario
 Banking in Ontario
 National Bank of Canada
 Royal Bank of Canada
 Communications in Ontario
 Internet in Ontario
 Radio stations in Ontario
 Television in Ontario
 Television stations in Ontario
 List of Ontario area codes
 Companies of Ontario
 Currency of Ontario - Ontario is a province and therefore shares its currency with the country in which it is located, Canada.
 Economic history of Ontario
 Energy in Ontario
 Environmental and energy policy of Ontario
 Oil industry in Ontario
 Electricity sector in Ontario
 Electrical generating stations in Ontario
 Hydroelectric generating stations in Ontario
 Wind farms in Ontario
 Biomass generating stations in Ontario
 Nuclear generating stations in Ontario
 Fossil fuel generating stations in Ontario
 Health care in Ontario
 List of hospitals in Ontario
 Emergency medical services in Ontario
 Mining in Ontario
 Mines in Ontario
 Ontario Stock Exchange
 Tourism in Ontario
 Water supply and sanitation in Ontario

Transport in Ontario 
Transport in Ontario
 Air transport in Ontario
 Airlines of Ontario
 Airports in Ontario
 Rail transport in Ontario
 Railways in Ontario
 Vehicular transport in Ontario
 List of automobiles manufactured in Ontario
 Vehicle registration plates of Ontario
 Roads in Ontario
 Ontario Provincial Highway Network
 List of provincial highways in Ontario
 400-series highways
 Former provincial highways in Ontario
 County roads in Ontario
 List of Ontario Tourist Routes

Education in Ontario 

Education in Ontario
The Ontario education system is unique in North America in that it has 4 education levels: grade school, high school, college, university.

 Primary education in Ontario
 School districts in Ontario
 English educational institutions in Ontario
 Grade school in Ontario
 High school in Ontario
 Higher education in Ontario
 List of Ontario students' associations
 College education in Ontario
 Public colleges in Ontario
 Art schools in Ontario
 Universities in Ontario
 Museums in Ontario
 Public libraries in Ontario

See also 

 Index of Ontario-related articles
 Outline of geography
 Outline of North America
 Outline of Canada
 Outline of Alberta
 Outline of British Columbia
 Outline of Manitoba
 Outline of Nova Scotia
 Outline of Quebec
 Outline of Prince Edward Island
 Outline of Saskatchewan

 Agricultural Research Institute of Ontario
 Alcohol and Gaming Commission of Ontario
 Alzheimer Society of Ontario
 Archaeology in Ontario
 Archives of Ontario
 Art Gallery of Ontario
 Aspergers Society of Ontario
 Assembly of Catholic Bishops of Ontario
 Association of International Physicians and Surgeons of Ontario
 Association of Management, Administrative and Professional Crown Employees of Ontario
 Association of Municipalities of Ontario
 Association of Power Producers of Ontario
 Association of Professional Geoscientists of Ontario
 Association of Registered Interior Designers of Ontario
 Attorney General of Ontario
 Auditor General of Ontario
 Battle of Ontario
 Bibliography of Ontario
 Bus companies in Ontario
 Canadian Baptists of Ontario and Quebec
 Census divisions of Ontario
 Certified General Accountants of Ontario
 Coat of arms of Ontario
 College of Physicians and Surgeons of Ontario
 College of Physiotherapists of Ontario
 College of Psychologists of Ontario
 College of Respiratory Therapists of Ontario
 Conference of Independent Schools of Ontario Athletic Association
 Council of Ontario Universities
 Court of Ontario
 Dairy Farmers of Ontario
 Demographics of Ontario
 Diocese of Ontario
 Ecclesiastical Province of Ontario
 Educational Computing Organization of Ontario
 Elementary Teachers' Federation of Ontario
 Environmental Commissioner of Ontario
 Executive Council of Ontario
 Federation of Women Teachers' Associations of Ontario
 Financial Services Regulatory Authority of Ontario
 First Presbyterian Church of Ontario Center
 Francophone Assembly of Ontario
 Francophone Association of Municipalities of Ontario
 Grand Lodge of Canada in the Province of Ontario
 Great Seal of Ontario
 Higher education in Ontario
 Higher Education Quality Council of Ontario
 Highways in Ontario
 Historic counties of Ontario
 Hospice Palliative Care Ontario
 Human Rights Tribunal of Ontario
 Index of Ontario-related articles
 John Lewis (Archbishop of Ontario)
 Law Union of Ontario
 Legislative Assembly of Ontario
 Liberal Catholic Church of Ontario
 Lieutenant Governor of Ontario
 Liquor Control Board of Ontario
 Liquor Licensing Board of Ontario
 Métis Nation of Ontario
 Ministers without portfolio in Ontario, 1993–95
 Ministry of Transportation of Ontario
 Mixed martial arts in Ontario
 Monarchy in Ontario
 Municipal elections in Ontario
 Museum of Ontario Archaeology
 Office of the Legislative Assembly of Ontario
 Official Opposition Shadow Cabinet of the 41st Legislative Assembly of Ontario
 Ontario New Democratic Party Shadow Cabinet of the 41st Legislative Assembly of Ontario
 Order of Ontario
 Order of precedence in Ontario
 Organic Council of Ontario
 Police Services Act of Ontario
 Professional Association of Internes and Residents of Ontario
 Province of Ontario Savings Office
 Provincial Secretary and Registrar of Ontario
 Real Estate Council of Ontario
 Registered Nurses' Association of Ontario
 Respiratory Therapy Society of Ontario
 Revised Statutes of Ontario
 Roads in Ontario
 Rocket v. Royal College of Dental Surgeons of Ontario
 Royal College of Dental Surgeons of Ontario
 Saint John's School of Ontario
 Same-sex marriage in Ontario
 Schizophrenia Society of Ontario
 Small Business Agency of Ontario
 Solicitor General of Ontario
 Speaker of the Legislative Assembly of Ontario
 Supreme Court of Ontario
 The Association of Registered Graphic Designers of Ontario
 Timeline of Ontario history
 Trespass to Property Act of Ontario
 United Farmers of Ontario
 University of Ontario Institute of Technology
 University of Ontario Institute of Technology Ridgebacks
 Value-added wood products in Ontario
 Vehicle registration plates of Ontario
 182nd Battalion (Ontario County), CEF
 1996 Southern Ontario tornadoes
 1998 Ontario Raiders season
 19th Battalion (Central Ontario), CEF
 1st (Western Ontario) Battalion
 2005 Ontario Kia Cup
 2006 Ontario Kia Cup
 2006 Ontario Scott Tournament of Hearts
 2006 Ontario terrorism plot
 2007 Ontario Scotties Tournament of Hearts
 2008 Ontario Scotties Tournament of Hearts
 2009 Ontario Scotties Tournament of Hearts
 2010 Ontario Men's Curling Championship
 2010 Ontario Scotties Tournament of Hearts
 2011 Ontario Scotties Tournament of Hearts
 2012–13 Ontario Curling Tour
 2012 Courtesy Freight Northern Ontario Superspiel
 2012 Ontario Scotties Tournament of Hearts
 2013 Ontario Scotties Tournament of Hearts
 20th Battalion (Central Ontario), CEF
 2nd Battalion (Eastern Ontario Regiment), CEF
 37th (Northern Ontario) Battalion, CEF
 401 East Ontario
 41st Ontario general election
 4th Battalion (Central Ontario), CEF
 Adler v. Ontario
 Adoption Disclosure Register (Ontario)
 AFL Ontario
 Air Ontario
 Air Ontario Flight 1363
 Alcohol and Gaming Regulation and Public Protection Act (Ontario)
 All Saints Catholic High School (Ontario)
 Allan Water (Ontario)
 Anti-Drug Secretariat (Ontario)
 Ask Ontario
 Attorney-General for Ontario v. Attorney-General for the Dominion
 Ault Park (Ontario)
 Baseball Ontario
 Bear Brook (Ontario)
 Bearbrook, Ontario
 Beaver Valley (Ontario)
 Black River Escarpment (Ontario)
 Blainey v. Ontario Hockey Association
 Bob Wood (Ontario provincial politician)
 Brockville Ontario Speedway
 Bruce (Ontario provincial electoral district)
 Byng Inlet (Ontario)
 C.U.P.E. v. Ontario (Minister of Labour)
 CAA South Central Ontario
 Caledonia High School (Ontario)
 Canadian federal election results in Central Ontario
 Canadian federal election results in Eastern Ontario
 Canadian federal election results in Midwestern Ontario
 Canadian federal election results in Northern Ontario
 Canadian federal election results in Southwestern Ontario
 Cancer Care Ontario
 Canyon View High School (Ontario, California)
 Carleton (Ontario electoral district)
 Catholic District School Board of Eastern Ontario
 Central Lake Ontario Conservation Authority
 Central Ontario
 Central Ontario Hockey League
 Central Ontario Junior C Hockey League
 Central Ontario Visitor
 Central Ontario Women's Hockey League
 Central Western Ontario Secondary Schools Association
 ChangeTheWorld: Ontario Youth Volunteer Challenge
 Chief Government Whip (Ontario)
 Children's Hospital at London Health Sciences Centre
 Children's Hospital of Eastern Ontario
 Chronic disease in Northern Ontario
 Citizens' Assembly on Electoral Reform (Ontario)
 Clean Water Act (Ontario)
 Co-operative Commonwealth Federation (Ontario Section)
 Commissioner of the Ontario Provincial Police
 Community Living Ontario
 Conseil des écoles publiques de l'Est de l'Ontario
 Conseil scolaire de district catholique du Nouvel-Ontario
 Conseil scolaire de district du Grand Nord de l'Ontario
 Conseil scolaire de district du Nord-Est de l'Ontario
 Conservation Ontario
 Court of Appeal for Ontario
 Courtesy Freight Northern Ontario Superspiel
 Crown agency (Ontario)
 Crown Attorney's Office (Ontario)
 CTV Northern Ontario
 Cuddy Chicks Ltd. v. Ontario (Labour Relations Board)
 CUPE Ontario and disinvestment from Israel
 Davenport railway station (Ontario)
 DECA Ontario
 District School Board Ontario North East
 Don Scott (Ontario author)
 Dunmore v. Ontario (Attorney General)
 East Ontario (Metrolink station)
 Eastern Ontario
 Eastern Ontario Junior Hockey League
 Eastern Ontario Senior Hockey League
 EHealth Ontario
 Elections Ontario
 Electricity policy of Ontario
 Engagements on Lake Ontario
 Fairness Commissioner (Ontario)
 First Nations Police (Ontario)
 First Ontario Parliament Buildings
 Foodland Ontario
 Fort Ontario
 Fort Ontario Emergency Refugee Shelter
 Fort St. Joseph (Ontario)
 Frontenac (Ontario electoral district)
 Gaming Control Act (Ontario)
 Gaming Control Commission Ontario
 Georgian Mid-Ontario Junior C Hockey League
 Government House (Ontario)
 Government House Leader (Ontario)
 Grand River Bridge (Ontario)
 Greater Ontario Junior Hockey League
 Greenwood (Ontario electoral district)
 Hamilton Public Library (Ontario)
 HealthForceOntario
 High Rock (Ontario)
 Highway Traffic Act (Ontario)
 Hike Ontario
 HMCS Ontario
 HMCS Ontario (C53)
 HMS Ontario
 HMS Ontario (1780)
 Hockey Northwestern Ontario
 Kawartha lakes (Ontario)
 Kent (Ontario electoral district)
 King's University College (University of Western Ontario)
 Kings Creek (Mississippi River Ontario)
 Kingston City Hall (Ontario)
 Knowledge Ontario
 La Galerie du Nouvel-Ontario
 Ladies Ontario Hockey Association
 Landscape Ontario
 Laurentian River System (Ontario)
 Lavigne v. Ontario Public Service Employees Union
 Layland v. Ontario
 Leader of the Opposition (Ontario)
 Legal Aid Ontario
 Liquor Licence Act (Ontario)
 List of curlers from Ontario
 List of French public schools in Eastern Ontario
 List of historical TVOntario transmitters
 List of musicians from Ontario
 List of people from Ontario
 List of programs broadcast by TVOntario
 List of schools of the Conseil des écoles publiques de l'Est de l'Ontario
 List of teams on the 2012-13 Ontario Curling Tour
 List of United Farmers/Labour MLAs in the Ontario legislature
 List of University of Western Ontario people
 Local services board (Ontario)
 Loch Lomond (Thunder Bay District)
 London Fringe Theatre Festival (Ontario)
 London Ontario Live Arts Festival
 Lovelace v. Ontario
 Management Board Secretariat (Ontario)
 Mara Provincial Park (Ontario)
 Member of Provincial Parliament (Ontario)
 Mental Health Act (Ontario)
 Michigan-Ontario League
 Mid-Ontario Junior B Hockey League
 MoveOntario 2020
 Municipal Act, 2001 (Ontario)
 Muskoka—Ontario
 Natural Environment Park (Ontario)
 Nature Reserve Park (Ontario)
 Nelson High School (Ontario)
 North Channel (Ontario)
 Northeastern Ontario
 Northern College (Ontario)
 Northern Ontario
 Northern Ontario Curling Association
 Northern Ontario Heritage Fund
 Northern Ontario Hockey Association
 Northern Ontario Junior Hockey Association
 Northern Ontario Junior Hockey League
 Northern Ontario Natural Gas
 Northern Ontario Resource Trail
 Northern Ontario Ring of Fire
 Northern Ontario School of Architecture
 Northern Ontario School of Medicine
 Northern Ontario Secondary Schools Association
 Northumberland (Ontario electoral district)
 Northwestern Ontario
 Northwestern Ontario Junior Hockey League
 Northwestern Ontario Sports Hall of Fame
 Office of the Integrity Commissioner (Ontario)
 Online Donor Registry (Ontario)
 Ontario
 Ontario's Drive Clean
 Ontario-Montclair School District
 Ontario (Amtrak station)
 Ontario (Attorney General) v. Canada Temperance Federation
 Ontario Academic Credit
 Ontario Agricorp
 Ontario Agricultural College
 Ontario Amateur Softball Association
 Ontario and Livingston Mutual Insurance Office
 Ontario Apartments
 Ontario Archaeological Society
 Ontario Arts Council
 Ontario Association of Art Galleries
 Ontario Association of Certified Engineering Technicians and Technologists
 Ontario Association of Food Banks
 Ontario Bank
 Ontario Blues
 Ontario Bond Scandal
 Ontario Cancer Institute
 Ontario CCF/NDP leadership elections
 Ontario Central Airlines
 Ontario Centre of Forensic Sciences
 Ontario Certified Teacher
 Ontario Charitable Gaming Association
 Ontario Civilian Commission on Police Services Board of Inquiry
 Ontario Civilian Police Commission
 Ontario Classical Association
 Ontario Clean Water Agency
 Ontario Co-operative Association
 Ontario Coalition Against Poverty
 Ontario Colleen Stakes
 Ontario College Advanced Diploma
 Ontario College Application Service
 Ontario College of Certified Social Workers
 Ontario College of Family Physicians
 Ontario College of Teachers
 Ontario Colleges Athletic Association
 Ontario Confederation of University Faculty Associations
 Ontario Consultants on Religious Tolerance
 Ontario Correctional Services
 Ontario Cottage
 Ontario County
 Ontario Court of Justice
 Ontario Craft Brewers
 Ontario Crafts Council
 Ontario Cup
 Ontario Curling Association
 Ontario Curling Tour
 Ontario Damsel Stakes
 Ontario Debutante Stakes
 Ontario Dental Association
 Ontario Deposit Return Program
 Ontario Derby
 Ontario Disability Support Program
 Ontario Educational Resource Bank
 2007 Ontario electoral reform referendum
 Ontario electoral reform referendum, 2007 detailed results
 Ontario Energy Board
 Ontario English Catholic Teachers' Association
 Ontario Express
 Ontario Family Law Act
 Ontario Fashion Stakes
 Ontario Federation of Agriculture
 Ontario Federation of Anglers and Hunters
 Ontario Federation of Labour
 Ontario Federation of School Athletic Associations
 Ontario Federation of Snowmobile Clubs
 Ontario Film Review Board
 Ontario Food Terminal
 Ontario Forest Research Institute
 Ontario Gazette
 Ontario Genomics Institute
 Ontario Geological Survey
 Ontario Global Edge Program
 Ontario Government Buildings
 Ontario Graduate Scholarship
 Ontario Greenbelt
 Ontario Gurdwara Committee
 Ontario Handweavers & Spinners
 Ontario Health Care Consent Act
 Ontario Health Insurance Plan
 Ontario Heritage Act
 Ontario Heritage Trust
 Ontario High School
 Ontario Hockey Association
 Ontario Hockey Federation
 Ontario Hockey League
 Ontario Hockey League history
 Ontario Horticultural Association
 Ontario Hospital Association
 Ontario Human Rights Code
 Ontario Human Rights Commission
 Ontario Human Rights Commission and O'Malley v. Simpsons-Sears Ltd.
 Ontario Human Rights Commission v. Etobicoke
 Ontario Hydro
 Ontario Hydro v. Ontario (Labour Relations Board)
 Ontario Institute for Cancer Research
 Ontario Institute for Studies in Education
 Ontario Institute of Audio Recording Technology
 Ontario Junior A Lacrosse League
 Ontario Junior B Lacrosse League
 Ontario Junior Hockey League
 Ontario Khalsa Darbar
 Ontario Knife Company
 Ontario Labour Relations Board
 Ontario Lacrosse Association
 Ontario Lacus
 Ontario Landowners Association
 Ontario Lassie Stakes
 Ontario League
 Ontario Legislative Building
 Ontario Library Association
 Ontario Linux Fest
 Ontario Local School District
 Ontario Lottery and Gaming Corporation
 Ontario March of Dimes
 Ontario Mathematics Olympiad
 Ontario Matron Stakes
 Ontario Medal for Good Citizenship
 Ontario Medal for Young Volunteers
 Ontario Medical Association
 Ontario men's provincial floorball team
 Ontario micropolitan area
 Ontario Mills
 Ontario Minamata disease
 Ontario Minor Hockey Association
 Ontario Model Parliament
 Ontario Morning
 Ontario Motor Speedway
 Ontario Motor Vehicle Industry Council
 Ontario Municipal Board
 1972 Ontario municipal elections
 1976 Ontario municipal elections
 1978 Ontario municipal elections
 1980 Ontario municipal elections
 1982 Ontario municipal elections
 1985 Ontario municipal elections
 1988 Ontario municipal elections
 1991 Ontario municipal elections
 1994 Ontario municipal elections
 1997 Ontario municipal elections
 2003 Ontario municipal elections
 2006 Ontario municipal elections
 2010 Ontario municipal elections
 2014 Ontario municipal elections
 Ontario Nature
 Ontario North
 Ontario Northland Motor Coach Services
 Ontario Northland Transportation Commission
 Ontario Nurses' Association
 Ontario Ombudsman
 Ontario Open
 Ontario Options
 Ontario Out of Doors
 Ontario Parks
 Ontario Parliament Network
 Ontario Pathways Rail Trail
 Ontario PC Youth Association
 Ontario Peak
 Ontario Place
 Ontario Place (theme park)
 Ontario Police College
 Ontario Pork Producers' Marketing Board
 Ontario Power Authority
 Ontario Power Building
 Ontario Power Generation
 Ontario Power Generation's Deep Geologic Repository
 Ontario Prehospital Advanced Life Support Studies
 Ontario Press Council
 Ontario Professional Hockey League
 Ontario Professional Planners Institute
 1894 Ontario prohibition plebiscite
 1902 Ontario prohibition referendum
 1919 Ontario prohibition referendum
 1921 Ontario prohibition referendum
 1924 Ontario prohibition referendum
 2007 Ontario provincial by-elections
 Ontario Provincial Junior A Hockey League (1972–1987)
 Ontario Provincial Police
 Ontario provincial spending, 2004
 Ontario Public Service Employees Union
 Ontario Raiders
 Ontario Real Estate Association
 Ontario Regiment Museum
 Ontario Reign
 Ontario rubric
 Ontario Rugby Football Union
 Ontario Rugby League Competition
 Ontario Rugby Union
 Ontario Savings Bond
 Ontario Scholar
 Ontario Science Centre
 Ontario Scotties Tournament of Hearts
 Ontario Secondary School Diploma
 Ontario Secondary School Literacy Test
 Ontario Secondary School Teachers' Federation
 Ontario Securities Commission
 Ontario Seniors' Secretariat
 Ontario Shores Centre for Mental Health Sciences
 Ontario silver mine
 Ontario Sire Stakes
 Ontario Soccer Association
 Ontario Soccer League
 Ontario Social Benefits Tribunal
 Ontario Social Safety Network
 Ontario Society for the Prevention of Cruelty to Animals
 Ontario Society of Artists
 Ontario Software Acquisition Program Advisory Committee
 Ontario South
 Ontario Sportsman Series
 Ontario State Recreation Site
 Ontario Student Assistance Program
 Ontario Student Classics Conference
 Ontario Student Trustees' Association
 Ontario Students Against Impaired Driving
 Ontario Superior Court of Justice
 Ontario Sustainable Energy Association
 Ontario Teachers' Federation
 Ontario Teachers' Pension Plan
 Ontario Telecommunications Association
 Ontario Telephone Service Commission
 Ontario Temperance Act
 Ontario tobacco belt
 Ontario Today
 Ontario Tower
 Ontario Tower (Dubai)
 Ontario Township
 Ontario Township, Knox County, Illinois
 Ontario Track and Field Association
 Ontario Truck
 Ontario Undergraduate Student Alliance
 Ontario Universities' Application Centre
 Ontario Universities Fair
 Ontario University Athletics
 Ontario University Athletics women's ice hockey
 Ontario v. Quon
 Ontario Veterans Memorial
 Ontario Veterinary College
 Ontario Visual Heritage Project
 Ontario Warriors
 Ontario Warriors (ABA)
 Ontario West
 Ontario wine
 Ontario Women's Directorate
 Ontario Young Liberals
 Ontario Youth Parliament
 Ontario.2048
 Ontarioville, Illinois
 Outstanding Ontario Library Award
 Park Place (Ontario)
 Pepsi Ontario Junior Curling Championships
 Preston High School (Ontario)
 Professional Engineers Ontario
 Queen's Printer for Ontario
 Recreation Park (Ontario)
 Regional Chair (Ontario)
 Residential Tenancies Act (Ontario)
 Results of the Canadian federal election, 2006: Ontario
 Royal Botanical Gardens (Ontario)
 Royal Ontario Museum
 Russell (Ontario electoral district)
 Russell High School (Ontario)
 ServiceOntario
 Silver Lake Provincial Park (Ontario)
 Slate Islands (Ontario)
 Sleeping Giant (Ontario)
 Social Contract (Ontario)
 Southern Ontario
 Southern Ontario Gothic
 Southern Ontario Junior A Hockey League
 Southern Ontario Junior Hockey League
 Southern Ontario Library Service
 Southern Ontario tornado outbreak of 2005
 Southern Ontario Tornado Outbreak of 2009
 Southwest Ontario Tornado Outbreak of 1984
 Southwestern Ontario
 Sportsnet Ontario
 St. Andrew's College (Ontario)
 St. Augustine Catholic High School (Ontario)
 St. George (Ontario provincial electoral district)
 St. Marys River (Michigan–Ontario)
 Storyland (Ontario)
 The Dominion 2009 Northern Ontario Provincial Men's Championship
 The Dominion 2010 Northern Ontario Provincial Men's Championship
 The Dominion 2011 Northern Ontario Men's Curling Championship
 The Dominion 2012 Northern Ontario Men's Curling Championship
 The Dominion Northern Ontario Men's Curling Championship
 The Ontario Regiment (RCAC)
 The Ontarion
 Théâtre du Nouvel-Ontario
 Thomas Baines (Ontario)
 Thunder Bay (Ontario landform)
 Toronto Ontario Temple
 Toronto Ontarios
 Transit Eastern Ontario
 TVOntario
 Unionville High School (Ontario)
 University of Western Ontario
 Victoria (Ontario electoral district)
 Victoria Hall (Ontario)
 Virtual High School (Ontario)
 Weber v. Ontario Hydro
 Western Ontario Athletic Association
 Western Ontario Hockey League
 Western Ontario Junior C Hockey League
 Western Ontario Mustangs
 Western Ontario Mustangs women's ice hockey
 White Lake Provincial Park (Ontario)
 Yobgorgle: Mystery Monster of Lake Ontario

 :Category:Indigenous peoples in Ontario
 :Category:Accidental deaths in Ontario
 :Category:Aerial photographs of Ontario roads
 :Category:Aerospace museums in Ontario
 :Category:Airports in Ontario
 :Category:Airports in Ontario by census division
 :Category:Anglican Church in Ontario
 :Category:Anglican church buildings in Ontario
 :Category:Anglican Diocese of Ontario
 :Category:Anishinaabe reserves in Ontario
 :Category:Art museums and galleries in Ontario
 :Category:Attorneys General of Ontario
 :Category:Automobile museums in Ontario
 :Category:Aviation in Ontario
 :Category:Baseball in Ontario
 :Category:Baseball teams in Ontario
 :Category:Bays of Ontario
 :Category:Beaches of Ontario
 :Category:Bike paths in Ontario
 :Category:Boarding schools in Ontario
 :Category:Bodies of water of Ontario
 :Category:Borders of Ontario
 :Category:Bridges in Ontario
 :Category:Buildings and structures in Ontario
 :Category:Buildings and structures in Ontario by census division
 :Category:Buildings and structures in Ontario by city
 :Category:Buildings and structures in Ontario by census division
 :Category:Bus stations in Ontario
 :Category:Bus transport in Ontario
 :Category:Canadian federal election results in Ontario
 :Category:Canadian football in Ontario
 :Category:Canadian football teams in Ontario
 :Category:Canadian Forces bases in Ontario
 :Category:Canadian National Railway stations in Ontario
 :Category:Canadian Pacific Railway stations in Ontario
 :Category:Canals in Ontario
 :Category:Deaths from cancer in Ontario
 :Category:Candidates in Ontario provincial elections
 :Category:Canyons and gorges of Ontario
 :Category:Carpenter Gothic church buildings in Ontario
 :Category:Casinos in Ontario
 :Category:Catholic Church in Ontario
 :Category:Catholic churches in Ontario
 :Category:Catholic elementary schools in Ontario
 :Category:Catholic school districts in Ontario
 :Category:Catholic schools in Ontario
 :Category:Catholic secondary schools in Ontario
 :Category:Cemeteries in Ontario
 :Category:Census divisions of Ontario
 :Category:Christianity in Ontario
 :Category:Churches in Ontario
 :Category:Cinema of Ontario
 :Category:Cinemas and movie theatres in Ontario
 :Category:Cities in Ontario
 :Category:City and town halls in Ontario
 :Category:Coal-fired power stations in Ontario
 :Category:Collections of the Art Gallery of Ontario
 :Category:Colleges in Ontario
 :Category:Historic trails and roads in Ontario
 :Category:Communications in Ontario
 :Category:Communist Party of Canada (Ontario) candidates in Ontario provincial elections
 :Category:Communities in Ontario by census division
 :Category:Companies based in Ontario
 :Category:Conservation areas in Ontario
 :Category:Conservation authorities in Ontario
 :Category:County and regional councils in Ontario
 :Category:Cree reserves in Ontario
 :Category:Crime in Ontario
 :Category:Crown corporations of Ontario
 :Category:Culture of Ontario
 :Category:Culture of Ontario by city
 :Category:Culture of Ontario by location
 :Category:Curling in Ontario
 :Category:Dams in Ontario
 :Category:Death in Ontario
 :Category:Deaths by firearm in Ontario
 :Category:Defunct airports in Ontario
 :Category:Defunct ice hockey leagues in Ontario
 :Category:Deputy premiers of Ontario
 :Category:Designated places in Ontario
 :Category:Diatremes of Ontario
 :Category:Disasters in Ontario
 :Category:Disease-related deaths in Ontario
 :Category:Earthquakes in Ontario
 :Category:Economy of Ontario
 :Category:Education in Ontario
 :Category:Education in Ontario by census division
 :Category:Elections in Ontario
 :Category:Elementary schools in Ontario
 :Category:Endemic fauna of Ontario
 :Category:Energy in Ontario
 :Category:Ethnic groups in Ontario
 :Category:Executive Council of Ontario
 :Category:Family Coalition Party of Ontario candidates in Ontario provincial elections
 :Category:Family Coalition Party of Ontario politicians
 :Category:Ferries of Ontario
 :Category:Ferry companies of Ontario
 :Category:Ferry transport in Ontario
 :Category:Festivals in Ontario
 :Category:Films set in Ontario
 :Category:Films shot in Ontario
 :Category:Finance ministers of Ontario
 :Category:First Nations governments in Ontario
 :Category:First Nations history in Ontario
 :Category:First Nations in Ontario
 :Category:First Nations organizations in Ontario
 :Category:Flora of Ontario
 :Category:Forests of Ontario
 :Category:Former counties in Ontario
 :Category:Former counties in Ontario
 :Category:Former municipalities in Ontario
 :Category:Former populated places in Ontario
 :Category:Former school districts in Ontario
 :Category:Former townships in Ontario
 :Category:Forts in Ontario
 :Category:Freedom Party of Ontario candidates in Ontario provincial elections
 :Category:Freedom Party of Ontario politicians
 :Category:French-language education in Ontario
 :Category:French-language elementary schools in Ontario
 :Category:French-language high schools in Ontario
 :Category:French-language mass media in Ontario
 :Category:French-language newspapers published in Ontario
 :Category:French-language radio stations in Ontario
 :Category:French-language school districts in Ontario
 :Category:French-language schools in Ontario
 :Category:French-language television stations in Ontario
 :Category:General elections in Ontario
 :Category:Geographic regions of Ontario
 :Category:Geography of Ontario
 :Category:Geography of Ontario by census division
 :Category:Geography of Ontario by city
 :Category:Geology of Ontario
 :Category:Ghost towns in Ontario
 :Category:Golf clubs and courses in Ontario
 :Category:Government of Ontario
 :Category:Green Party of Ontario
 :Category:Green Party of Ontario candidates in Ontario provincial elections
 :Category:Green Party of Ontario politicians
 :Category:Health in Ontario
 :Category:Health regions of Ontario
 :Category:Heritage railways in Ontario
 :Category:Heritage sites in Ontario
 :Category:High schools in Ontario
 :Category:Higher education in Ontario
 :Category:Hiking trails in Ontario
 :Category:Townships of Ontario
 :Category:Progressive Conservative Party of Ontario MPPs
 :Category:History of Ontario
 :Category:History of Ontario by location
 :Category:Holidays in Ontario
 :Category:Hospitals in Ontario
 :Category:Hotels in Ontario
 :Category:Houses in Ontario
 :Category:Hydroelectric power stations in Ontario
 :Category:Ice hockey governing bodies in Ontario
 :Category:Ice hockey in Ontario
 :Category:Ice hockey leagues in Ontario
 :Category:Ice hockey players in Ontario
 :Category:Ice hockey teams in Ontario
 :Category:Ice hockey teams in Ontario by league
 :Category:Images of Ontario
 :Category:Impact craters of Ontario
 :Category:Important Bird Areas of Ontario
 :Category:Independent candidates in Ontario provincial elections
 :Category:Independent MPPs in Ontario
 :Category:Indian reserves in Ontario
 :Category:Indigenous leaders in Ontario
 :Category:Infectious disease deaths in Ontario
 :Category:International Baccalaureate schools in Ontario
 :Category:Interurban railways in Ontario
 :Category:Islands of Ontario
 :Category:Jews and Judaism in Ontario
 :Category:Judges in Ontario
 :Category:Labor-Progressive Party of Ontario MPPs
 :Category:Labor-Progressive Party of Ontario MPPs
 :Category:Labour MPPs in Ontario
 :Category:Lacrosse in Ontario
 :Category:Lacrosse teams in Ontario
 :Category:Lakes of Ontario
 :Category:Lakes of Ontario by census division
 :Category:Landforms of Ontario
 :Category:Law enforcement agencies of Ontario
 :Category:Lawyers in Ontario
 :Category:Leaders of the Freedom Party of Ontario
 :Category:Leaders of the Green Party of Ontario
 :Category:Leaders of the Progressive Conservative Party of Ontario
 :Category:Leaders of the United Farmers of Ontario/Progressives
 :Category:Legislative Assembly of Ontario
 :Category:LGBT in Ontario
 :Category:Libraries in Ontario
 :Category:Lieutenant Governors of Ontario
 :Category:Lighthouses in Ontario
 :Category:Lists of historic places in Ontario
 :Category:Lists of mayors of places in Ontario
 :Category:Lists of Ontario county roads
 :Category:Lists of political office-holders in Ontario
 :Category:Lists of roads in Ontario
 :Category:Local government in Ontario
 :Category:Local government in Ontario by city
 :Category:Local services boards in Ontario
 :Category:Magazines published in Ontario
 :Category:Maps of Ontario federal electoral districts
 :Category:Maps of Ontario provincial electoral districts
 :Category:Maritime museums in Ontario
 :Category:Marshes of Ontario
 :Category:Mayors of places in Ontario
 :Category:Mass media by city in Ontario
 :Category:Mass media by region in Ontario
 :Category:Mass media in Ontario
 :Category:Members of the Executive Council of Ontario
 :Category:Members of the Legislative Assembly of Ontario
 :Category:Members of the Order of Ontario
 :Category:Metropolitan areas of Ontario
 :Category:Metropolitans of Ontario
 :Category:Middle schools in Ontario
 :Category:Military forts in Ontario
 :Category:Mines in Ontario
 :Category:Mining communities in Ontario
 :Category:Mining in Ontario
 :Category:Mohawk reserves in Ontario
 :Category:Monuments and memorials in Ontario
 :Category:Mosques in Ontario
 :Category:Mountain ranges of Ontario
 :Category:Mountains of Ontario
 :Category:Municipal councils in Ontario
 :Category:Municipal elections in Ontario
 :Category:Municipal elections in Ontario by city
 :Category:Municipal parks in Ontario
 :Category:Municipalities in Ontario by census division
 :Category:Museum ships in Ontario
 :Category:Museums in Ontario
 :Category:Museums in Ontario by census division
 :Category:Music festivals in Ontario
 :Category:Music venues in Ontario
 :Category:Narrow gauge railways in Ontario
 :Category:National Historic Sites in Ontario
 :Category:National Hockey League in Ontario
 :Category:Native grasses of Ontario
 :Category:Natural areas in Ontario
 :Category:Natural disasters in Ontario
 :Category:Natural gas-fired power stations in Ontario
 :Category:Natural history of Ontario
 :Category:Natural Law Party of Ontario politicians
 :Category:Nature centres in Ontario
 :Category:Neighbourhoods in Ontario
 :Category:Newspapers published in Ontario
 :Category:Novels set in Ontario
 :Category:Nuclear power stations in Ontario
 :Category:Oil-fired power stations in Ontario
 :Category:Oji-Cree reserves in Ontario
 :Category:Anishinaabe reserves in Ontario
 :Category:Ontario Liberal Party candidates in Ontario provincial elections
 :Category:Ontario Libertarian Party candidates in Ontario provincial elections
 :Category:Ontario New Democratic Party candidates in Ontario provincial elections
 :Category:Organizations based in Ontario
 :Category:Parks in Ontario
 :Category:Parks in Ontario by census division
 :Category:Parkways in Ontario
 :Category:Passenger rail transport in Ontario
 :Category:Passenger railways in Ontario
 :Category:Peninsulas of Ontario
 :Category:People by populated place in Ontario
 :Category:People by county, district, or region in Ontario
 :Category:People murdered in Ontario
 :Category:Political history of Ontario
 :Category:Politicians in Ontario
 :Category:Politics of Ontario
 :Category:Politics of Ontario by locality
 :Category:Populated places in Ontario
 :Category:Port settlements in Ontario
 :Category:Ports and harbours of Ontario
 :Category:Power stations in Ontario
 :Category:Premiers of Ontario
 :Category:Preparatory schools in Ontario
 :Category:Presidents of the Green Party of Ontario
 :Category:Presidents of the Progressive Conservative Party of Ontario
 :Category:Prisons in Ontario
 :Category:Private colleges in Ontario
 :Category:Private schools in Ontario
 :Category:Progressive Conservative Party of Ontario
 :Category:Progressive Conservative Party of Ontario candidates in Ontario provincial elections
 :Category:Progressive Conservative Party of Ontario MPPs
 :Category:Progressive Conservative Party of Ontario politicians
 :Category:Protected areas of Ontario
 :Category:Protected areas of Ontario by census division
 :Category:Provincial parks of Ontario
 :Category:Provincial political parties in Ontario
 :Category:Provincial Secretaries of Ontario
 :Category:Provincial symbols of Ontario
 :Category:Public libraries in Ontario
 :Category:Public transport in Ontario
 :Category:Racehorses bred in Ontario
 :Category:Radio stations in Ontario
 :Category:Rail infrastructure in Ontario
 :Category:Rail trails in Ontario
 :Category:Rail transport in Ontario
 :Category:Railway bridges in Ontario
 :Category:Railway museums in Ontario
 :Category:Railway roundhouses in Ontario
 :Category:Railway stations in Ontario
 :Category:Railway tunnels in Ontario
 :Category:Ramsar sites in Ontario
 :Category:Referendums in Ontario
 :Category:Reform Party of Ontario politicians
 :Category:Regional airlines of Ontario
 :Category:Religion in Ontario
 :Category:Religious buildings and structures in Ontario
 :Category:Reptiles of Ontario
 :Category:Restaurants in Ontario
 :Category:Rivers of Ontario
 :Category:Rivers of Ontario by census division
 :Category:Road bridges in Ontario
 :Category:Roads in Ontario
 :Category:Roads in Ontario by census division
 :Category:Roads in Ontario by city
 :Category:Roller coasters in Ontario
 :Category:Rugby union in Ontario
 :Category:Rugby union teams in Ontario
 :Category:School districts in Ontario
 :Category:Schools in Ontario
 :Category:Schools in Ontario by census division
 :Category:Schools in Ontario by city
 :Category:Ships built in Ontario
 :Category:Shopping malls in Ontario
 :Category:Ski areas and resorts in Ontario
 :Category:Soccer clubs in Ontario
 :Category:Soccer in Ontario
 :Category:Speakers of the Legislative Assembly of Ontario
 :Category:Sport in Ontario
 :Category:Sport in Ontario by city
 :Category:Sports governing bodies in Ontario
 :Category:Sports teams in Ontario
 :Category:Sports venues in Ontario
 :Category:Sportspeople in Ontario
 :Category:Stratigraphy of Ontario
 :Category:Student newspapers published in Ontario
 :Category:Geographic regions of Ontario
 :Category:Suicides by firearm in Ontario
 :Category:Suicides by hanging in Ontario
 :Category:Suicides in Ontario
 :Category:Synagogues in Ontario
 :Category:Television shows filmed in Ontario
 :Category:Television shows set in Ontario
 :Category:Television stations in Ontario
 :Category:Theatre companies in Ontario
 :Category:Theatre in Ontario
 :Category:Theatres in Ontario
 :Category:Tourism in Ontario
 :Category:Towers in Ontario
 :Category:Towns in Ontario
 :Category:Township municipalities in Ontario
 :Category:Townships of Ontario
 :Category:Transit agencies in Ontario
 :Category:Transport in Ontario
 :Category:Transport in Ontario by census division
 :Category:Transport in Ontario by city
 :Category:Transport museums in Ontario
 :Category:Trees of Ontario
 :Category:Tunnels in Ontario
 :Category:Uninhabited islands of Ontario
 :Category:Union of Ontario Indians
 :Category:United Church of Canada churches in Ontario
 :Category:United Farmers of Ontario MLAs
 :Category:United Farmers of Ontario MPs
 :Category:United Farmers of Ontario politicians
 :Category:Universities and colleges in Ontario
 :Category:Universities in Ontario
 :Category:University of Ontario Institute of Technology
 :Category:Unorganized areas in Ontario
 :Category:Valleys of Ontario
 :Category:Via Rail stations in Ontario
 :Category:Villages in Ontario
 :Category:Tourist attractions in Ontario
 :Category:Tourist attractions in Ontario by census division
 :Category:Volcanism of Ontario
 :Category:Volcanoes of Ontario
 :Category:Water transport in Ontario
 :Category:Waterfalls of Ontario
 :Category:Weekly newspapers published in Ontario
 :Category:Wetlands of Ontario
 :Category:Wikipedia requested maps in Ontario
 :Category:Wikipedia requested photographs in Ontario
 :Category:Wikipedia requested images of people of Ontario
 :Category:Wikipedians in Ontario
 :Category:Wikipedians in Ontario, California
 :Category:Wikipedians interested in Ontario
 :Category:Wind farms in Ontario
 :Category:Wine regions of Ontario
 :Category:Women in Ontario
 :Category:Women in Ontario politics
 :Category:Women MPPs in Ontario

References

External links 

Government of Ontario
 

Ontario
Ontario